The 1942 Akron Zippers football team was an American football team that represented the University of Akron as an independent during the 1942 college football season. In its second and final season under head coach Otis Douglas, the team compiled a 0–7–2 record and was outscored by a total of 186 to 26. The team played its home games at the Rubber Bowl in Akron, Ohio.

Following the 1942 season, Douglas left the school for service in the United States Navy's V-5 training program for air cadets. The suspended its participation in intercollegiate football and did not field another team until 1946.

Schedule

References

Akron
Akron Zips football seasons
Akron Zippers football